West Berlin is an unincorporated community located within Berlin Township in Camden County, New Jersey, United States. The area is served as United States Postal Service ZIP code 08091.

As of the 2000 United States Census, the population for ZIP Code Tabulation Area 08091 was 5,237.

Diggerland expanded into the United States and opened a park in West Berlin, New Jersey in 2014.

Demographics

References

External links
Census 2000 Fact Sheet for ZIP Code Tabulation Area 08091 from the United States Census Bureau

Berlin Township, New Jersey
Unincorporated communities in Camden County, New Jersey
Unincorporated communities in New Jersey

vo:Towaco